Samuel Boardman (born September 8, 1995) is an American cyclist, who currently rides for UCI Continental team . He competed as a runner until college when he began cycling, after being unable to make the team at UCLA, where he attended college.

Major results

2017
 5th Overall Tour of Poyang Lake
2018
 2nd Overall Chico Stage Race
 5th Overall San Dimas Stage Race
2019
 1st Stage 2 Tour of Murrieta
 2nd Overall Tour of Poyang Lake
1st Stage 3
 3rd Overall San Dimas Stage Race
 4th Overall Redlands Bicycle Classic

References

External links
 

1995 births
Living people
American male cyclists
Sportspeople from Washington, D.C.